Amra is the name of certain ancient Irish elegies or panegyrics on native saints. The best known is Amra Coluimb Chille (the song of Columbkille).

Amra Coluim Chille
According to the traditional account the Amra Coluim Chille was composed about the year 575 by Dallán Forgaill, the Chief Ollam of Ireland of that time, in gratitude for the services of St. Columba in saving the bards from expulsion at the great assembly of Druim Cetta in that year.

"The Amra is not", says Stokes, "as Professor Atkinson supposed, a fragment which indicates great antiquity." Strachan, however, on linguistic grounds, assigns it in its present form to about the year 800 (Rev. Celt., XVII, 14).

Stokes, too, seems to favour this view (ibid., XX, 16). But Strachan adds "perhaps something more may be learned from a prolonged study of this and other such as the Amra Senain and the Amra Conroi." Dallan was the author of the former, "held in great repute", says Colgan, "on account of its gracefulness", and also of another Amra on St. Conall Cael of Inishkeel in Donegal, with whom he was buried in one grave.

Editions
The Amra Coluim Chille was printed with a translation by O'Beirne Crowe in 1871 from the imperfect text in the Lebor na hUidre; also in his edition of the "Liber Hymnorum" by Professor Atkinson, and in his "Goidelica" by Whitley Stokes, from an imperfect text in Trinity College, Dublin.

The Bodleian text (Rawlinson B. 502) was edited, with a translation, for the first time (Rev. Celt., vols. XX-XXI) by Stokes.

The standard modern edition of the Amra is the 2019 work by Jacopo Bisagni.

References

External links
 Saint Dallán Forgaill (c.560 -c.640), alias Eochaid Éices

Sources

Christianity in medieval Ireland
Christian hagiography
Christian poetry